Qaleh Chogha (also Romanized as Qal‘eh Choghā) is a village in Khorram Makan Rural District, Kamfiruz District, Marvdasht County, Fars Province, Iran. At the 2006 census, its population was 655, in 151 families.

References 

Populated places in Marvdasht County